Cosmopterix rhyncognathosella is a moth of the family Cosmopterigidae. It is known from Russia, China (Sichuan, Emeishan) and Japan.

The length of the forewings is about 3.8 mm.

References

rhyncognathosella
Moths of Japan